Reynoldsonia reynoldsonia is a freshwater dugesiidae triclad found in Australia. It is the only species in the genus Reynoldsonia.

References

Dugesiidae